Nini Camps (born in Miami, Florida) is an American folk rock singer-songwriter, who writes music for film and TV while also performing as lead singer of the all female band Antigone Rising. She currently lives with her family in New York City.

Biography
Nini Camps was born and raised in Miami, Florida. In her beginnings as a solo artist, Camps performed at clubs including The Bitter End, The Mercury Lounge, and The Living Room. 

Camps has published three independent releases. She has participated in a national tour with Los Lonely Boys, performed at Madison Square Garden with Joan Osborne, and went on a stadium tour as an ambassador for the United States during the 2006 FIFA World Cup in Germany.

Camps won Billboard's Songwriter Award and was Spin's Top 5 singer-songwriter for her self-released album, "So Long". In 2005, she signed with Cherry Lane Music Publishing. Camps has over 50 TV, commercial, and film placements, including songs on Brothers and Sisters, Castle, Pretty Little Liars, The Hills, Army Wives, Degrassi: The Next Generation which features an unreleased song "Come Away" at the end of episode "Lost in Love Part 2", Pantene, Paseo Paper, Sydney White and end credits for Ramona and Beezus. Camps continues to write and record in New York City and her home studio. After Cherry Lane closed its doors, Camps contineud working in music publishing at Razor and Tie.

In August 2009, Camps joined the all-female band Antigone Rising, as the new lead singer and rhythm guitarist.  The band released a studio CD in August 2011 called 23 Red – funded through over $40,000 of fan donations – enabling the band to create their own record label, Rising Shine Records. 23 Red is distributed through Joan Jett's Blackheart Record label (MMD). Beginning in October 2011, Starbucks worldwide featured "Everywhere is Home" & "Gracefully" from 23 Red into regular in-store rotation.

Discography
 Love Pie
 So Long
 Driving You Out

References

External links

 Official website
 MySpace page

Songwriters from Florida
American women singers
American women guitarists
American entertainers of Cuban descent
American folk musicians
American LGBT songwriters
American LGBT singers
Living people
Year of birth missing (living people)
21st-century American women